Brigham Cecil Gates (August 17, 1887 – August 31, 1941) was an American music conductor and composer.

Life
Gates was born in Laie, Oahu, Kingdom of Hawaii, to Jacob F. Gates and his wife Susa Young Gates, Americans from Utah Territory serving in Hawaii as missionaries for the Church of Jesus Christ of Latter-day Saints (LDS Church). He was the second of the couple's 12 children.

Following early training in music from teachers at Brigham Young Academy, John H. McClellan, and the New England Conservatory of Music, Gates taught piano in St. George, Utah.
 
From 1907 to 1910, Gates served was an LDS Church missionary in the Eastern States Mission, which was headquartered in New York City. He studied in the Scharwenka Conservatory of Music in Berlin from 1910 to 1913 and graduated with high honors.

On June 30, 1917, Gates married Gweneth Gibbs in the Salt Lake Temple. They were the parents of five children.

From 1913 to 1925, Gates was head of the Music Department of the LDS University, the predecessor of LDS Business College. During this period, he began what later became the McCune School of Music, assembling a faculty. The school gained national recognition for the high quality of its administration and teachings.

In 1920, when the LDS Church organized its General Church Music Committee, Gates was one of its original 13 members.

From 1916 to 1935, Gates was assistant director of the Mormon Tabernacle Choir. He was a member of the General Board of the Young Men's Mutual Improvement Association from 1918 to 1929. With his sister Emma Lucy Gates Bowen, he organized the Lucy Gates Grand Opera Company of Salt Lake City in 1915 and there conducted many of the world's great operas. In 1926, Gates was appointed chairman of the Music Department at Utah State University. He also composed a significant number of choral and orchestral works, popular with people at all levels of musical background and ability.

Gates also served as director of the Salt Lake Oratorio Society.

Gates died in Salt Lake City after suffering from a debilitating illness for several years before his death.

Legacy
The B. Cecil Gates Opera Workshop, which is part of the Franklin S. Harris Fine Arts Center at BYU is used for the rehearsal and preparation of student productions of opera. It is also used as a large lecture classroom.

The Gates Opera Workshop is a rectangular room just off the de Jong Concert Hall stage. An oversized doorway permits transporting of large scene pieces back and forth from stage area to the workshop room. A capacious storage area is located in the west side of the room, and access to it from the tunnel is possible, permitting trucks and equipment to be moved in easily (Special Program, 8).

Among works by Gates are an arrangement of The Lord's Prayer, the Easter cantata "Resurrection Morning", "My Redeemer Lives", "How Long Oh Lord Most Holy and True" (words by his brother-in-law, John A. Widtsoe), "Hear My Prayer" and "The Festival Overture".

See also 
Emma Lucy Gates Bowen

Notes

References 
 http://history.cfac.byu.edu/index.php/Brigham_Cecil_Gates - Special Program for Naming of Areas, Franklin S. Harris Fine Arts Center. Tuesday, November 23, 1965 at Brigham Young University
 J. Spencer Cornwall.  Stories of Our Mormon Hymns. (Salt Lake City, Utah: Deseret Book, 1975) p. 85.
 Sheet Music plus entry for Gates

1887 births
1941 deaths
American Latter Day Saint hymnwriters
American male composers
American composers
Brigham Young Academy alumni
Ensign College faculty
Tabernacle Choir members
New England Conservatory alumni
Musicians from Salt Lake City
Richards–Young family
Klindworth-Scharwenka Conservatory alumni
Utah State University faculty
Young Men (organization) people
American Mormon missionaries in the United States
20th-century Mormon missionaries
American leaders of the Church of Jesus Christ of Latter-day Saints
American expatriates in the Hawaiian Kingdom
American expatriates in Germany
Latter Day Saints from Massachusetts
Latter Day Saints from Utah
20th-century American male musicians